The 2019 FIBA Basketball World Cup qualification for the FIBA Asia-Oceania region began in November 2017 and concluded in February 2019. The process determined the seven teams that would join the automatically qualified hosts China at the 2019 FIBA Basketball World Cup.

Seeding

The 16 participating teams at the 2017 FIBA Asia Cup did participate in the first round of the FIBA Basketball World Cup Asian qualifiers. China, the host of the 2019 FIBA Basketball World Cup, also participated in the qualifiers despite being automatically qualified for the FIBA Basketball World Cup as hosts. The seeding of eight pots used in the draw were determined on the basis of the team's FIBA World Rankings and "geographic principles". Teams in pots with an odd number were either drawn on Group A or B while teams in pots with an even number were drawn on Group C or D.

 (*) At the time of the draw, teams which hasn't secured qualification for the 2017 FIBA Asia Cup. Discounting FIBA Basketball World Cup hosts China, four teams from the East Asia region, a team each for Central Asia, Southeast Asia, and South Asia have not qualified yet at that time for the FIBA Asia Cup and thus placeholder teams selected on the basis of FIBA World Rankings were used for the draw. Should these teams have not qualify for the continental tournament, the qualifying teams could have replaced them. All of the placeholder teams later secured qualification.

First round
All times are local.

Group A

Group B

Group C

Group D

Second round
In the second round, the top three teams from each group were placed in a group with three teams from another group. All results from the first qualification round were carried over to the second round. Games were played in September 2018, November 2018 and February 2019. The top three teams in each group along with the better placed fourth team qualified for the FIBA Basketball World Cup.

The 2019 FIBA Basketball World Cup host, China, was not taken into consideration for qualifying spots. However, all results related to the previous games of China in the relevant group were taken into account for the final standings.

Group E

Group F

Best fourth placed team

Statistical leaders

Players
Points

Rebounds

Steals

Assists

Blocks

Minutes

Double-Doubles

Other statistical leaders

Controversy

Australia – Philippines brawl

During the Group B match between the Philippines and Australia on 2 July 2018 in the Philippine Arena, a bench-clearing brawl broke out when an Australian player intentionally elbowed a Filipino player with 4:02 remaining in the third quarter, resulting in 13 players (nine from the Philippines and four from Australia) being ejected. The game was halted with 1:57 remaining in the third quarter when two of the remaining Filipino players fouled out, and awarded the win to Australia by default.

Notes

References

External links
Official website

qualification
FIBA
Basketball competitions in Asia between national teams
2017–18 in Asian basketball
2018–19 in Asian basketball